Morin-Heights is a town in the Laurentian Mountains region of Quebec, Canada. It is west of Saint-Sauveur and north of Lachute; municipally, it is within the Regional County Municipality of Les Pays-d'en-Haut.

It is primarily a tourist town, having a large ski hill (Ski Morin Heights) that is popular during the winter months and being on a recreational trailway (the Aerobic Corridor), which is used year-round. A dense network of hiking, cross country skiing, snowshoeing and mountain biking trails surround Morin Heights, making it the closest multi-recreational outdoor hub to Montreal (45-minute drive in moderate traffic). The old train station, on Lac Écho road, is the starting point for most recreational activities, year-round. The Rivière à Simon offers enjoyable canoeing and kayaking all the way down to Christieville and beyond.

Formerly located just south of the town was a recording studio, called Le Studio, built in 1975, which is now closed. The facility was used by numerous Canadian and international artists, including The Tragically Hip, Rush,  Nazareth, Pilot,  April Wine, Asia, Rainbow, Barenaked Ladies, Sting, The Police,  The Rolling Stones, David Bowie, The Bee Gees, Cat Stevens, and Lawrence Gowan, as well as by Quebec artists Jean-Pierre Ferland, Richard Séguin, Lucien Francœur and Garolou. In 1994, another important music recording facility was built in Morin Heights, on the northern edge of town. Conceived and built by Swedish-born artist Lars Westvind, Studio Nomade exclusively hosted Sarah McLachlan's recording projects up to 2000. It then was open to other artists, and is still a frequently used production facility. The town hosts a theatre company featuring mostly English-language plays, as well as a choir.

History
The first European settlers (the Seale brothers) arrived from Ireland around 1850, followed by French Canadians from Lachute, Saint-Jérôme and Saint-Eustache. In 1852, the Morin Township was formed and in 1855, the Township Municipality of Morin-Partie-Sud was established in a part of the township (the remaining part became Sainte-Adèle).

An alternate, less accepted origin for the name Morin concerns an engineer named Morin who was dispatched by the provincial government to survey the region and had hired a Native American named Simon as guide, whose name was used to identify the river flowing through the township.

Until 1911, the territory had just the names of Bas-Morin or Morin Flats, name of the post office between 1875 and 1911, while the railway station was known as Morin Heights Station. In 1950, Morin-Partie-Sud changed its statutes and name to become the Municipality of Morin-Heights.

The town gained notoriety in 1994 when members of the Order of the Solar Temple took part in a mass suicide, after setting fire to the ski chalet they occupied in the community.

On March 12, 2008, a roof collapse in the Gourmet du Village bakery warehouse killed three women. An excessive accumulation of snow was suspected to be the cause of the accident. A total of 40 people were in the building at the time of the collapse.

Demographics

Private dwellings occupied by usual residents: 2211 (total dwellings: 2762)

Home language:
 English: 17%
 French: 74.8%
 other language only: 4.5%

Education

Sir Wilfrid Laurier School Board operates Anglophone public schools:
 Morin Heights Elementary School
 Laurentian Regional High School in Lachute

Morin Heights Library serves the community.

See also
List of municipalities in Quebec

References

External links
Morin Heights municipal/community Web Site
Morin Heights Historical Association

Morin Heights
Municipalities in Quebec
Incorporated places in Laurentides